The AAG Gold Medal is the highest award given by the international Association of Applied Geochemists (AAG). It recognizes recipients' lifetime achievements, or significant contributions to geochemistry and its applications. The medal is minted with the name of the recipient and the year of the award from two troy ounces of silver bullion.

Recipients
The following have received the gold medal:

See also

 List of geology awards

References

Awards established in 1995
Geochemistry
Geology awards